Crazy Little Thing (also known as The Perfect You) is a 2002 romantic comedy film written and directed by Matthew Miller. The film stars Chris Eigeman and Jenny McCarthy.

After the September 11th attacks, the shots of the World Trade Center remained in the film.

Cast 
 Chris Eigeman as Jimmy
 Jenny McCarthy as Whitney Ann Barnsley III
 Drea de Matteo as Dee, Whitney's Neighbour
 Paul Dooley as Jimmy's Dad
 Josh Stamberg as Eddie Oshinski
 Alanna Ubach as Wendy
 Aubrey Dollar as Gina Vosola
 Joelle Carter as Kate
 Brian Anthony Wilson as Phil

References

External links 
 
 

2002 films
2000s English-language films
2002 romantic comedy films
American sex comedy films
American independent films
2000s sex comedy films
2002 independent films
2000s American films